= Aghbazh =

Aghbazh اغباز
- Location within Pakistan
- Coordinates: 31.54°N 69.99°E
- Country: Pakistan
- Territory: Federally Administered Tribal Areas
- Elevation: 2,239 m (7,346 ft)
- Time zone: UTC+5 (PST)
  - Summer (DST): UTC+6 (PDT)

Aghbazh (Urdu: اغباز) is a town in the Federally Administered Tribal Areas of Pakistan. It is located at 31°32'33N 69°59'17E with an altitude of 2239 metres (7349 feet).
